The Edmund Parker Jr. House is a historic house in Winchester, Massachusetts. The -story wood-frame house was built c. 1826, and is one of a few transitional Federal-Greek Revival houses in the town. It has the typical Federal plan of five bays wide and two deep, with a center entry framed by a Greek Revival portico.  The house was built by Edmund Parker Jr., whose father was one of the first settlers in the area.

The house was listed on the National Register of Historic Places in 1989.

See also
National Register of Historic Places listings in Winchester, Massachusetts

References

Houses on the National Register of Historic Places in Winchester, Massachusetts
Houses in Winchester, Massachusetts